Uroš II, also known as Primislav (Примислав) or Prvoslav (Првослав), was Serbian Grand Prince from 1145 to 1162, with brief interruptions as ruler by Desa, his brother. His rule was characterized by a period of power struggle, not only of the Serbian throne between the brothers but between the Byzantine Empire and Kingdom of Hungary, of which he took advantage. He had two brothers Desa and Beloš, and a sister Helena of Serbia, Queen of Hungary. Furthermore, Uroš II also had to contend with the Second Norman invasion of the Balkans (1147-1149).

Background

Grand Prince Vukan I (r. 1083–1112) initially ruled Rascia under the overlordship of Constantine Bodin, the titular King of Doclea. Bodin renounced the Byzantine Empire in 1089, when he turned to the Pope, who raised the bishopric of Bar to an Archbishopric. In 1089 or by 1091, the Byzantines invaded Doclea, capturing Bodin. Civil war ensued in Doclea, and Rascia asserted independence. Vukan immediately raids Byzantine territory, first in Kosovo, then northern Macedonia. As the Emperor had affairs in other parts of the Empire (Levounion, Crusade), Vukan accepts and then breaks the peace treaties signed between the two, back and forth, until 1106 when the final treaty is signed.

In Doclea, Bodin dies before 1101, and his heirs are forced to recognize Byzantine overlordship.

Life
Uroš II was the son of Uroš I, Grand Prince of Serbia (r. ca. 1112–1145) and Anna Diogenissa, granddaughter of Byzantine Emperor Romanos IV Diogenes. He had two brothers: Desa and Beloš, and a sister: Helena, who married Béla II of Hungary.

In 1141, Béla II died and was succeeded by his son Géza II who was still a child. Helena and Beloš (who joined Helena in Hungary after the marriage, and received the title of dux), became the official regents of Hungary until September 1146. In 1145, Beloš receives the title of comes palatinus, the highest court title - meaning he could substitute for the King when necessary. Beloš had close ties with Uroš II, and they were able to count on each other in times of trouble. In 1149, Beloš' Hungarian army aids Uroš II against the Byzantines.

Desa is mentioned in a charter dated 1150 as "Dessa Dioclie, Terbunie et Zacholmie dux", i.e. the Duke of Duklja, Travunija and Zahumlje.

In 1150, Uroš II swore loyalty to the Emperor, and demanded that Desa be put in prison. He recovered his title and lands, and Desa also swore loyalty, and was recognized as ruler of the Dalmatian lands. The two brothers were to rule the appointed regions as Manuel's vassals. The event is part of what would become a competition between the Byzantine Emperor and Holy Roman Emperor that would soon move into Hungary.

In 1151, Manuel I declares war on Hungary. This was due to the fact that Hungary had aided Serbia in its revolts against Byzantine rule. Byzantine troops are sent into Srem and across the Danube. The Byzantines caused great destruction and then withdrew, the operation being strictly punitive, with no occupation of lands. Géza soon signed a peace treaty. Over the next 20 years, there were to be 10 campaigns against Hungary. Manuel I was able to keep the Hungarians under control in the Balkans, at the expense of abandoning the Norman conflict.

In 1153 or 1155, Desa ousts him. The pro-Hungarian faction at the Serbian court was upset with the Byzantine overlordship. In autumn 1154, Manuel I settles the dispute between Uroš II and Desa. The Emperor restored Uroš II in 1155 or 1156, and gave the deposed Desa an appanage of Dendra near Niš.

In 1161/1162, Uroš II is replaced by Beloš, who rules briefly, before returning to his office in Hungary and Croatia.

Aftermath

Zavida had presumably tried to oust either Uroš II or Desa, or acquire an appanage of his own, then fled after failing in his attempt.

Ancestry

Notes

References

Sources

Further reading

12th-century Serbian monarchs
Eastern Orthodox monarchs
12th-century Byzantine people
People of the Grand Principality of Serbia
12th-century Eastern Orthodox Christians
Christian monarchs